Marlene Mountain (née Morelock; December 11, 1939 – March 15, 2018), also known as Marlene Morelock Wills, was an American poet, artist, and activist. She wrote many English-language haiku and concrete poems.

She was the 2014-2015 honorary curator of the American Haiku Archives at the California State Library in Sacramento.

Femku Magazine has a haiku contest named after Mountain.

Biography
Mountain was born in Ada, Oklahoma. She earned a BFA from the University of Oklahoma in painting and an MA in painting from the University of North Dakota. She began writing haiku in 1968.

After she married her husband, John Wills, she moved with him to east Tennessee.

Writing
She wrote several one-line haiku and was also known for writing visual haiku (short poems that had visual effects like that of concrete poetry), which she referred to as "dadaku" or "unaloud haiku" and are sometimes also called "eye-ku".

Personal life
She was married to John Wills, another haiku poet. They later divorced.

Bibliography
 the old tin roof, 1976, self-published
 Pissed off poems ; and Cross words, 1986
 cur*rent (with Francine Porad), Vandina Press, 1998
 probably: 'real' renga sorta (with Francine Porad), Vandina Press, 2002
 one-line twos (with Kala Ramesh), Bones, 2015

See also
 Carlos Colón

References

External links
 Official website

English-language haiku poets
People from Ada, Oklahoma
1939 births
2018 deaths
University of Oklahoma alumni
University of North Dakota alumni